The Electronic Entertainment Expo 2020 (E3 2020) would have been the 26th E3, during which hardware manufacturers, software developers, and publishers from the video game industry would have presented new and upcoming products. The event, organized by the Entertainment Software Association (ESA), was to take place at the Los Angeles Convention Center from June 9–11, 2020. However, due to concerns over the COVID-19 pandemic, the ESA announced it would cancel the event, marking the first time since the launch of E3 in 1995 that it was not held. In lieu of that, several publishers made plans to continue with presentations of game announcements during the planned E3 period, while others opted to use more traditional marketing throughout the year.

Format and changes
In the days prior to the event, major hardware and software vendors were to host press conferences at nearby venues, where they would introduce new hardware and games that would be on display at the exhibitor's hall during the actual event. Within the event period, attendees would have been able to view these products at the exhibitor's hall, often including playable game demos, attended special presentations offered by companies, and in some cases, had private meetings with companies on their products. The E3 period is often used by journalists from video game publications as well as social media influencers to provide initial comments on these new games. This also enables retailers to plan out what products to purchase for the remainder of the year, particularly for critical Christmas and holiday sales periods.

E3 2020 was due to continue to offer public passes to the event, though the number offered was increased to 25,000 from 15,000 from the prior E3 event.

The ESA stated that they planned to revise the format for E3 2020 to feature more interactivity for attendees as to reflect the changing audience for the show, and looking to make it a "fan, media and influencer festival". ESA stated the event would be "an exciting, high-energy show featuring new experiences, partners, exhibitor spaces, activations, and programming that will entertain new and veteran attendees alike". ESA president Stanley Pierre-Louis said they were inspired by the Keanu Reeves moment from E3 2019 as the type of event they can't plan for but thrive on, and wanted to create more opportunities for similar events in the future. Part of this would have been achieved by bringing more "celebrity gamers" to various facets of the exposition. Among ESA's creative partners had included iam8bit as creative directors. However, in early March 2020, iam8bit announced they had pulled out as creative directors for the show.

Sony Interactive Entertainment, who had presented at every E3 until E3 2019, stated they would not attend E3 in 2020 for a second year in a row, as the new vision of the show did not meet their goals, and instead they will present at a number of smaller events throughout the year. Microsoft's Xbox division had affirmed they would attend the show, where it was expected that more details of the 4th generation of the Xbox consoles, including the Xbox Series X with release planned in late 2020, would be announced.

Geoff Keighley, who had organized and hosted the E3 Coliseum, a live-streamed event over the course of E3 with interviews with developers and publishers, since E3 2017, said that he had decided not to participate this year nor be a part of E3, the first time in 25 years. Pierre-Louis stated that they had still planned to have digital programming like E3 Coliseum.

Cancellation due to the COVID-19 pandemic
In wake of the COVID-19 pandemic and the state of emergency declared by Los Angeles County in early March 2020, ESA stated then that they were assessing the situation but at the time were still planning on going ahead with the event. The ESA formally announced they had officially canceled the physical event on March 11, 2020, stating "Following increased and overwhelming concerns about the COVID-19 virus, we felt this was the best way to proceed during such an unprecedented global situation. We are very disappointed that we are unable to hold this event for our fans and supporters. But we know it's the right decision based on the information we have today." In addition to providing full refunds for participants, the ESA was looking into options for virtual presentations for exhibitors to use during the planned week as an alternative event.

On April 7, 2020, the ESA told PC Gamer that they had determined they would not be able to host a digital E3 event as the disruption caused by the pandemic made it difficult to assemble the event. Instead, the ESA would offer to manage individual partners' announcements via the E3 website.

Alternative events

Microsoft
Microsoft announced after the cancellation of E3 2020 that it would host a digital event to cover information it had planned to provide at E3, including games and details on the fourth generation of Xbox consoles it launched in 2020. Starting in May 2020, Microsoft began running monthly events to reveal new games for the Xbox Series X and other hardware details.

Among the games Microsoft revealed on its May 7, 2020, event include:

 The Ascent - Neon Giant 
 Assassin's Creed Valhalla - Ubisoft Montreal 
 Bright Memory: Infinite - FYQD Studio 
 Call of the Sea - Out of the Blue 

 Chorus - Fishlabs 
 Dirt 5 - Codemasters 
 Madden NFL 21 - EA Tiburon 
 The Medium - Bloober Team 
 Scarlet Nexus - Bandai Namco Studios 

 Scorn - Ebb Software 
 Second Extinction - Systemic Reaction 
 Vampire: The Masquerade – Bloodlines 2 - Hardsuit Labs 
 Yakuza: Like a Dragon - Ryu Ga Gotoku Studio 

Microsoft had a second games reveal event on July 23, 2020, focusing primarily on titles from the Xbox Game Studios. These included:

 As Dusk Falls - Interior/Night 
 Avowed - Obsidian Entertainment 
 CrossfireX Campaign - Smilegate 
 Destiny 2: Beyond Light - Bungie 
 Everwild - Rare 
 Fable - Playground Games 
 Forza Motorsport - Turn 10 Studios 
 Grounded - Obsidian Entertainment 

 The Gunk - Image & Form 
 Halo Infinite - 343 Industries 
 The Medium - Bloober Team 
 New Genesis: Phantasy Star Online - Sega 
 Ori and the Will of the Wisps - Moon Studios 
 Psychonauts 2 - Double Fine 

 The Outer Worlds: Peril On Gorgon - Obsidian Entertainment 
 S.T.A.L.K.E.R. 2 - GSC Game World 
 Senua's Saga: Hellblade II - Ninja Theory 
 State of Decay 3 - Undead Labs 
 Tell Me Why - Dontnod Entertainment 
 Tetris Effect Connected - Monstars 
 Warhammer 40,000: Darktide - Fatshark

Sony
Sony ran its major reveal of the PlayStation 5 console and numerous games in an online presentation on June 11, 2020. Among the games revealed include:

 Astro's Playroom - Japan Studio
 Bugsnax - Young Horses
 Deathloop - Arkane Studios
 Demon's Souls (2020 video game) remake - Bluepoint Games
 Destruction AllStars - Lucid Games
 Ghostwire: Tokyo - Tango Gameworks
 Godfall - Counterplay Games
 Goodbye Volcano High - KO_OP
 Grand Theft Auto V and Grand Theft Auto Online - Rockstar Games

 Gran Turismo 7 - Polyphony Digital
 Hitman 3 - IO Interactive
 Horizon Forbidden West - Guerrilla Games
 Jett: The Far Shore - Superbrothers
 Kena: Bridge of Spirits - Emberlab
 Little Devil Inside - Neostream Interactive
 NBA 2K21 - Visual Concepts
 Oddworld: Soulstorm - Oddworld Inhabitants, Frima Studio
 Pragmata - Capcom

 Project Athia - Luminous Productions
 Ratchet & Clank: Rift Apart - Insomniac Games
 Resident Evil Village - Capcom
 Returnal - Housemarque
 Sackboy: A Big Adventure - Sumo Digital
 Solar Ash - Heart Machine
 Spider-Man: Miles Morales - Insomniac Games
 Stray - Bluetwelve

Nintendo
Nintendo had planned to hold a mainline Nintendo Direct presentation in June 2020 to showcase its planned offerings for the rest of 2020 as its means for alternate E3 announcements. However, complications related to the pandemic caused the event to be cancelled. Many reports indicated they would focus on the 35th anniversary of the Super Mario series in the event, with titles such as Mario Kart Live: Home Circuit and Super Mario 3D All-Stars, which they later did in September 2020.

Electronic Arts
Electronic Arts, which has generally held its "EA Play" side event alongside E3 in a nearby Los Angeles location in the previous years but has not been part of E3 directly, instead held an "EA Play" online showcase on June 18, 2020. Among game announcements, EA stated their plan to continue to bring their games to the Steam platform for Windows (in addition to their Origin platform), including the EA Access subscription program, and to the Nintendo Switch and a larger commitment to cross-platform play for more of their titles. New or update titles presented during the presentation included Apex Legends, It Takes Two, Lost in Random, Rocket Arena, and Star Wars: Squadrons, as well as a planned new game in the Skate series.

Devolver Digital 
Devolver Digital, which had already planned to run a streamed event at E3, held their showcase on July 11, 2020. The showcase continued the narrative around the company's fictional chief synergy officer Nina Struthers from previous years wrapped around the various announcements. Among the announcements included:

 Carrion - Phobia Game Studio 
 Devolverland Expo - Flying Wild Hog 
 Fall Guys: Ultimate Knockout - Mediatonic 

 Olija - Skeleton Crew 
 Serious Sam 4 - Croteam  
 Shadow Warrior 3 - Flying Wild Hog

Ubisoft 
Ubisoft ran a "Ubisoft Forward" digital event on July 12, 2020, announcing several upcoming titles, including:

Assassin's Creed: Valhalla 
Far Cry 6 
Hyper Scape 
Watch Dogs: Legion

Limited Run Games 
Limited Run Games planned to run an online presentation for its upcoming games on June 8, 2020, but the event was delayed and ultimately canceled due to the George Floyd protests.

IGN Summer of Gaming 
The video game website IGN ran an online "Summer of Gaming" expo from June 11 to 13, 2020, that featured announcements, gameplay trailers and interviews with developers. Among the new games revealed or featured during this expo were: 

13 Sentinels: Aegis Rim - Vanillaware 
Alex Kidd in Miracle World DX - Jankenteam 
Beyond Blue - E-Line Media 
Blankos Block Party - Third Kind Games 
Blue Fire - Robi Studios 
Borderlands 3 - Gearbox Software 
Bravery Network Online - Gloam Collective 
CastleStorm 2 - Zen Studios 
Chivalry 2 - Torn Banner Studios  
CRSED: F.O.A.D. - Darkflow Software 
Demon Turf - Fabraz 
Dual Universe - Novaquark 
Everspace 2 - Rockfish Games 
Foreclosed - Antab Studios 
GTFO - 10 Chambers Collective 
Guilty Gear Strive - Arc System Works 

Hardspace: Shipbreaker - Blackbird Studios 
The Iron Oath - Curious Panda Games 
Lucifer Within Us - Kitfox Games 
Metal: Hellsinger - The Outsiders 
Mortal Shell - Playstack 
Nickelodeon Kart Racers 2: Grand Prix - GameMill Entertainment 
Observer: System Redux - Bloober Team 
Pathfinder: Kingmaker - Owlcat Games 
Phantasy Star Online 2 - Sega  
Ranch Simulator - Toxic Dog 
The Riftbreaker - Exor Studios  
Rustler - Jutsu Games 
Samurai Jack: Battle Through Time - Soleil 

Second Extinction - Systemic Reaction 
Skater XL - East Day Studios 
Spellbreak - Proletariat, Inc. 
Star Renegades - Massive Damage 
Stronghold: Warlords - Firefly Studios 
Total War: Troy - Creative Assembly 
Unto the End - 2 Ton Studios 
Voidtrain - Neagra 
Wasteland 3 - inXile Entertainment 
The Waylanders - Gato Studio 
Warhammer 40,000: Mechanicus - Bulwark Studios 
Werewolf: The Apocalypse – Earthblood - Cyanide (
XIII Remake - Microids 
Yakuza: Like a Dragon - Ryu Ga Gotoku Studio

Guerrilla Collective Live / PC Gaming Show / Future Games Show  
Several independent and larger publishers presented a series of announcement streams between June 13 and 15, hosted by Greg Miller, as part of the "Guerrilla Collective" in lieu of E3. Among those participating include Rebellion Developments, Raw Fury, Paradox Interactive, Larian Studios, Funcom, Versus Evil, ZA/UM, Coffee Stain Studios, 11 Bit Studios, and Humble Publishing.

The June 13 Guerrilla Collective presentation partnered with PC Gamer PC Gaming Show and GamesRadar Future Games Show to also run their showcases the same day. Among the presentations in the PC Gaming Show included Epic Games Store, Frontier Developments, Intel, Perfect World Entertainment, and Tripwire Interactive.

The following games were announced or covered during the three shows:

30XX - Batterystaple Games 
A Juggler's Tale - Kaleidoscube 
Aeolis Tournament - Beyond Fun Studio 
Airborne Kingdom - The Wandering Band 
Alaloth - Champions of The Four KingdomsGamera Interactive 
Almighty: Kill Your Gods - Runwild Entertainment 
The Almost Gone - Happy Volcano 
Ambition: A Minuet of Power - Joy Manufacturing Co. 
Among Trees - FJRD Interactive 
Anno: Mutationem - Beijing ThinkingStars Technology Development 
ArcheAge - XL Games 
Baldur's Gate III - Larian Studios 
Blankos: Block Party - Third Kind Games 
Blightbound - Romino Games 
Boyfriend Dungeon - Kitfox Games 
The Cabbage Effect - Ninja Garage 
Calico - CatBean Games 
Call of the Sea - Out of the Blue 
The Captain is Dead - Thunderbox Entertainment 
Cardaclysm - Headup Games 
Carrion - Phobia Game Studio 
Cartel Tycoon - Moon Moose 
Carto - Sunhead Games 
Children of Morta - Dead Mage 
Cloudpunk - Ion Lands 
Colt Canyon - Retrific 
Coreupt - Rogue Co 
Cris Tales - Dreams Uncorporated 
Crusader Kings 3 - Paradox Development Studio 
Cyanide & Happiness – Freakpocalypse - Serenity Forge 
Cygni: All Guns Blazing - KeelWorks 
Dead Static Drive - Fanclub 
Disco Elysium - ZA/UM 
Disintegration - V1 Interactive 
Divinity: Original Sin 2 - Larian Studios 
Doggone - Raconteur Games 
dont_forget_me - The Moon Pirates 
Doors of Insanity - OneShark 
Drake Hollow - The Molasses Flood 
Dreamscaper - Afterburner Studios 
The Dungeon of Naheulbeuk: The Amulet of Chaos - Artefacts Studio 
Dustborn - Red Thread Games 
Dwarf Fortress - Bay 12 Games/Kitfox Games 
Dwarfheim - Pineleaf Studios 
Edo No Yami - roglobytes Games 
El Hijo: A Wild West Tale - Honig Studios 
Eldest Souls - Fallen Flag Studios 
Elite Dangerous - Frontier Developments 
Empire of Sin - Romero Games 
Escape from Tarkov - Battlestate Games 
The Eternal Cylinder - ACE Team 
Evan's Remains - Whitehorn Digital 
Everspace 2 - Rockfish Games 
Evil Genius 2 - Rebellion Developments 
Exo One - Exbleative 
Fae Tactics - Endlessfluff Games 
The Falconeer - Tomas Sela 
Fall Guys: Ultimate Knockout - Mediatonic 
Fights in Tight Spaces - Ground Shatter 

Floppy Knights - Rose City Games 
The Forgotten City - Modern Storyteller 
Frostpunk - 11 Bit Studios 
Genesis Noir - Feral Cat Den 
Gestalt: Steam and Cinder - Metamorphosis Games 
Get to the Orange Door - Headup Games 
Ghostrunner - One More Level 
Gloomwood - New Blood Interactive 
Godfall - Counterpoint Games 
Gonner2 - Art in Heart 
Gori: Cuddly Carnage - Angry Demon Studio 
Hammerting - Team17 
Story of Seasons: Friends of Mineral Town - Marvelous Interactive 
Haven - The Game Bakers 
Hotshot Racing - Lucky Mountain Games 
Humankind - Amplitude Studios 
Hundred Days - Broken Arms Games 
Icarus - RocketWerks 
Ikenfell - Chevy Ray 
In Sound Mind - We Create Stuff 
Inkulinati - Yaza Games 
Jay and Silent Bob Chronic Blunt Punch - Interabang Entertainment 
Just Die Already - DoubleMoose 
Kena: Bridge of Spirits - Emberlab 
Lake - Gamious 
The Last Campfire - Hello Games 
Last Oasis - Donkey Crew 
Later Daters - Bloom Digital Media 
Liberated - Atomic Wolf 
Lord Winklebottom Investigates - Cave Monsters 
Lost at Sea - Studio Fizbin 
Mafia: Definitive Edition - Hanger 13 
Maid of Sker - Wales Interactive 
Main Assembly - Bad Yolk Games 
Metal: Hellsinger - The Outsiders 
Midnight Ghost Hunt - Vaulted Sky Games 
Minute of Islands - Studio Fizbin 
Morbid: The Seven Acolytes - Still Running 
Mortal Shell - Cold Symmetry 
Neon Abyss - Team17 
New World - Amazon Game Studios Orange County 
Night Call - Monkey Moon 
No Place for Bravery - Glitch Factory 
No Straight Roads - Sold-Out Software 
Nuts - Noodlecake 
One Step from Eden - Thomas Moon Kang 
Ooblets - Glumberland 
Operation Tango - Clever Plays 
Outbuddies DX - Headup Games 
The Outlast Trials - Red Barrels 
Outriders - People Can Fly 
Paradise Killer - Fellow Traveller 
Paradise Killer - Kaizen Game Works 
Paradise Lost - PolyAmorous 
Per Aspera - Tlön Industries 
Persona 4 Golden - Atlus 
Popup Dungeon - Triple.B.Titles 
Potionomics - Voracious Games 
Princess Farmer - Samboee Games 

Prison Architect - Double Eleven 
Prodeus - Bounding Box Software 
Project Wingman - Sector D2 
Pull Stay - Nito Souji 
Pushy and Pully in Blockland - Resistance Studio 
Quantum Error - Big Panther Media 
Raji: An Ancient Epic - Nodding Heads Games 
Read Only Memories: Neurodiver - Midboss 
Red Sails - Red Sails Team 
Remnant: From the Ashes - Gunfire Games 
Remothered: Broken Porcelain - Stormind Games 
Rigid Force: Redux - Headup Games 
Ring of Pain - Simon Boxer 
Rogue Company - First Watch Games 
Röki - Polygon Treehouse 
ScourgeBringer - Flying Oak Games 
Serial Cleaners - Draw Distance 
Shadow Man Remastered - Nightdive Studios 
Shadows of Doubt - ColePowered Games 
Sherlock Holmes: Chapter One - Frogwares 
Skate Story - Sam Eng 
SkateBird - Glass Bottom Games 
Skater XL - Easy Day Studios 
Skeleton Crew - Cinder Cone 
Slay the Spire - Megacrit 
Smite - Titan Forge Games 
Source of Madness - Carry Castle 
Space Crew - Curve Digital 
Speed Limit - Gamechuck 
Spellbreak - Proletariat, Inc. 
Stage Hands! - suchagamestudio 
Star Renegades - Massive Damage 
Summer in Mara - Chibig 
Surviving the Aftermath - Haemimont Games 
Suzerain - Torpor Games 
Swimsanity! - Decoy Games 
System Shock - Nightdive Studios 
Torchlight 3 - Echtra Inc. 
Trash Sailors - fluckyMachine 
Twin Mirror - Dontnod Entertainment 
Ultrakill - New Blood Interactive 
Unbound: Worlds Apart - Alien Pixel Studios 
UnDungeon - Laughing Machines 
Unexplored 2: The Wayfarer's Legacy - Ludomotion 
Unfortunate Spacemen - New Blood Interactive 
Uragun - Kool2Play 
Valheim - Iron Gate AB 
Vampire: The Masquerade – Bloodlines 2 - Hardsuit Labs 
Vigil: The Longest Night - Glass Heart Games 
Waking - tinyBuild 
Wasteland 3 - InXile Entertainment 
Wave Break - Funktronic Labs 
Weird West - WolfEye Studios 
Welcome to Elk - Triple Topping 
Werewolf: The Apocalypse – Heart of the Forest - Different Tales 
West of Dead - Upstream Arcade 
Windjammers 2 - Dotemu 
Wolfstride - OTA IMON Studios

Summer Game Fest 
Games journalist Geoff Keighley arranged with numerous developers to run a four-month Summer Game Fest from May to August 2020, helping developers and publisher to host live streams and other events in lieu of the cancellation of E3 and Gamescom. Alongside the Summer Game Fest, Keighley promoted the third Steam Game Festival, following after The Game Awards 2019 and from the previously canceled 2020 Game Developers Conference, which ran from June 16 through June 22, 2020. Over 900 games had demos available on Steam for players to try, alongside a slate of interviews with developers throughout the period. A similar event for Xbox One games occurred from July 21 to 27, 2020, as part of the Summer Game Fest.

Among games and other announcements made during the Summer Game Fest include:
 Tony Hawk's Pro Skater 1 + 2, a remastered version of Tony Hawk's Pro Skater and its sequel for modern systems.
 Unreal Engine 5, the next iteration of Epic Games' game engine to be released in mid-2021.  
 Star Wars: Squadrons, a new game from Motive Studios and Electronic Arts featuring team-play combat using the spacecraft of the Star Wars universe like X-wing fighters and TIE fighters.
 Crash Bandicoot 4: It's About Time, a sequel to the original trilogy of Crash Bandicoot games on the original PlayStation console, being developed by Toys for Bob and Activision.
 Cuphead releasing for the PlayStation 4.

New Game+ Expo
An online video game presentation that was organized by Suda51 and Sean Chiplock that showcased many upcoming games for the remainder of 2020 and early 2021.

The games that were announced during the presentation were:

 13 Sentinels: Aegis Rim - ATLUS 
 Billion Road - Bandai Namco Entertainment 
 Bloodstained: Curse of the Moon 2 - INTI CREATES CO., LTD. 
 Bright Memory: Infinite - FYQD Studio 
 Café Enchanté - Idea Factory 
 Cat Girl Without Salad: Amuse-Bouche - WayForward 
 Catherine: Full Body - ATLUS 
 Collar X Malice - Idea Factory 
 Collar X Malice Unlimited - Idea Factory 
 Cosmic Defenders - Fiery Squirrel 
 Danganronpa: Trigger Happy Havoc Anniversary Edition - Toydea Inc., Spike Chunsoft 
 Death end re;Quest 2 - Idea Factory, Compile Heart 
 Evolutis - Poke Life Studio 
 Fairy Tail - GUST 

 Fallen Legion: Revenants - YummyYummyTummy, Inc. 
 Fight Crab - Nussoft 
 Giraffe and Annika - atelier mimina 
 Guilty Gear Strive - Arc System Works Co., Ltd. 
 Idol Manager - GlitchPitch 
 Legends of Ethernal - Lucid Dreams Studio 
 Mad Rat Dead - Nippon Ichi Software 
 Mighty Switch Force! Collection - WayForward 
 NEOGEO Pocket Color Selection - Code Mystics 
 Neptunia Virtual Stars - Idea Factory, Compile Heart 
 Piofiore: Fated Memories - Idea Factory 
 Pretty Princess Party - Nippon Columbia 
 Prinny 1•2: Exploded and Reloaded - Nippon Ichi Software 
 Re:ZERO - Starting Life in Another World: The Prophecy of the Throne - Chime Corporation 

 Robotics;Notes Double Pack - MAGES. Inc. 
 Samurai Shodown Season Pass 2 - SNK CORPORATION 
 Samurai Shodown NEOGEO Collection - Digital Eclipse 
 Shiren the Wanderer: The Tower of Fortune and the Dice of Fate - Spike Chunsoft 
 Tasogare ni Nemuru Machi - Orbital Express 
 Tin & Kuna - Black River Studios 
 The Legend of Heroes: Trails of Cold Steel III - Nihon Falcom 
 The Legend of Heroes: Trails of Cold Steel IV - Nihon Falcom 
 Vitamin Connection - WayForward 
 void tRrLM(); //Void Terrarium - Nippon Ichi Software 
 Volta-X - GungHo America 
 Ys IX: Monstrum Nox - Nihon Falcom

References 

2020 in Los Angeles
2020 in video gaming
Cancelled events in the United States
2020
Events cancelled due to the COVID-19 pandemic
Impact of the COVID-19 pandemic on the video game industry
Impact of the COVID-19 pandemic in the United States